is a city located in Gunma Prefecture, Japan. , the city had an estimated population of 213,303 in 91,789 households, and a population density of 1500 persons per km2.

Geography
Isesaki is located in the northwestern part of the Kantō Plain of southern Gunma Prefecture. It is adjacent to Saitama Prefecture across the Tone River, which runs through the southern part of the city.

Surrounding municipalities
Gunma Prefecture
 Maebashi
 Kiryū
 Ōta
 Midori
 Tamamura

Saitama Prefecture
 Honjō
 Fukaya

Climate
Isesaki has a humid continental climate (Köppen Cfa) characterized by warm summers and cold winters with heavy snowfall.  The average annual temperature in Isesaki is 14.5 °C. The average annual rainfall is 1256 mm with September as the wettest month. The temperatures are highest on average in August, at around 26.6 °C, and lowest in January, at around 3.3 °C. On June 26, 2022, the temperature in the city reached 40.2 °C, the highest ever recorded in Japan for the month of June.

Demographics
Per Japanese census data, the population of Isesaki has increased steadily over the past 60 years.

History
Isesaki developed during the Sengoku period as a castle town surrounding Akaishi Castle, a stronghold in southern Kōzuke Province controlled by the Yura clan. During the Edo period, it was the center of Isesaki Domain, a feudal domain under the Tokugawa shogunate controlled by the Sakai clan. The area also contained two post towns on the Nikkō Reiheishi Kaidō, a subroute to Nikkō Kaidō which connected the Nakasendō  directly with Nikkō, bypassing Edo.

Isesaki Town was created within Sai District, Gunma Prefecture on April 1, 1889 with the creation of the modern municipalities system after the Meiji Restoration. Sai District and Nawa District merged to form Sawa District in 1896. It merged with the villages of Uehasu and Moro to form the city of Isesaki on September 13, 1940. On January 10, 1955 the village of Misato was annexed by Isesaki, followed by the villages of Nawa, Toyouke and Miyagō on March 25 of the same year.

On January 1, 2005 the towns of Akabori and Sakai, and village of Azuma were incorporated into Isesaki. On April 1, 2007, Isesaki was proclaimed a special city (tokureishi) with increased autonomy.

Government
Isesaki has a mayor-council form of government with a directly elected mayor and a unicameral city council of 29 members. Isesaki contributes five members to the Gunma Prefectural Assembly. In terms of national politics, the city is part of the Gunma 2nd district of the lower house of the Diet of Japan.

Economy
Isesaki (along with neighboring Kiryū) was traditionally famous for sericulture since ancient times, with a cloth called "Isesaki Meisen" as one of its most famous products. This cloth has been made since the late 17th century, and became popular during the Meiji and Taishō periods. Now, however, due to the ubiquity of Western-style clothes, its popularity is decreasing.

The automotive equipment and electrical equipment manufacturing company Sanden Corporation is headquartered in Isesaki. Also the city is home to Meisei Electric, a communications and electronics equipment and electric measuring instruments manufacturing company. Large industrial parks have been built in the suburbs, making it one of the leading industrial cities in the northern Kantō region.

It is also the location of J-List, a retailer of anime goods, visual novels and related products from Japan.

Education

Universities
Jobu University
Tokyo University of Social Welfare – Isesaki Campus

Primary and secondary schools
Isesaki has 22 public elementary schools and 12 public middle schools operated by the city government, and five public high schools operated by the Gunma Prefectural Board of Education. Then prefecture also operates three special education schools for the handicapped.

Transportation

Railway
 JR East – Ryōmō Line
  - 
 Tobu Railway – Tobu Isesaki Line
  -  -  -

Highway
  – Isesaki Interchange, Hashie Parking Area

Local attractions
 Former home of Tajima Yohei
 Grave of Kunisada Chūji
 Isesaki Jinja
 Goshiki Onsen
 Kezouji Park (Amusement park)

Sister-city relations
 Teradomari, Niigata, Japan, friendship city since 1986
 Springfield, Missouri, United States, since 1986 
 Ma'anshan, Anhui, China, friendship city since 1989.

Noted people from Isesaki
 Mitsuru Adachi, manga artist
 Tsutomu Adachi, manga artist
 Atsushi Imaruoka, voice actor
 Takashi Ishizeki, politician
 Mr. Pogo, professional wrestler

References

External links

Official Website 

Cities in Gunma Prefecture
Isesaki, Gunma